14-Hydroxydihydrocodeine (RAM-318) is an opiate analgesic drug, which is also an active metabolite of oxycodone and hydromorphinol. 14-Hydroxydihydrocodeine is not currently marketed in any developed country, but has been of interest to pharmaceutical companies looking for new analgesics and antitussives.

References 

4,5-Epoxymorphinans
Mu-opioid receptor agonists
Semisynthetic opioids